The Mirror Thief is a 2016 debut novel authored by Martin Seay. "Set in three different versions of Venice (Italy, California, and Las Vegas) during three different time periods (16th century, mid-20th, early 21st)," it follows Mark Lawson's reading of The Mirror Thief, a book tied to Stanley Glass.

Plot
The plot is "set in three different versions of Venice (Italy, California, and Las Vegas) during three different time periods (16th century, mid-20th, early 21st)." It follows Curtis Stone as he looks for card counter Stanley Glass in Las Vegas, Nevada, but instead finds a book which "inspired" Glass's life called The Mirror Thief; this takes Stone into a mise en abyme through his reading.

In a review for The Guardian, Mark Lawson noted that "Topics under consideration range from why bingo is a fascist game, through penetrating reflections on the poetry of Ezra Pound and techniques of glass-making, to the visual resemblance between the French philosopher Michel Foucault and the Greek-American actor Telly Savalas."

Critical reception
The novel received good reviews from The New York Times and The Guardian.

References

2016 American novels
Novels set in Las Vegas
Novels set in Los Angeles
Novels set in Venice
2016 debut novels
Melville House Publishing books